Castillo de San Felipe may refer to:

 Castillo San Felipe de Barajas in Colombia
 Castillo de San Felipe de Lara in Guatemala
 Castillo San Felipe del Morro in Puerto Rico

 Castillo de San Felipe in Venezuela